Rafayel Davidovich Grach (August 6, 1932 – June 14, 1982) was a Soviet speed skater who competed in the 1956 Winter Olympics, 1960 Winter Olympics and 1964 Winter Olympics. He was born in Kirov, Russia. Grach won the silver medal at the 1956 Winter Olympics and bronze medal at the 1960 Winter Olympics in speed skating.

Personal records

Olympic results

See also
List of select Jewish speed skaters

External links
 Rafayel Grach's profile at skateresults
 Rafayel Grach's profile at Sports Reference.com

1932 births
1982 deaths
Russian male speed skaters
Soviet male speed skaters
Olympic speed skaters of the Soviet Union
Speed skaters at the 1956 Winter Olympics
Speed skaters at the 1960 Winter Olympics
Speed skaters at the 1964 Winter Olympics
Olympic silver medalists for the Soviet Union
Olympic bronze medalists for the Soviet Union
Olympic medalists in speed skating
Medalists at the 1956 Winter Olympics
Medalists at the 1960 Winter Olympics
Sportspeople from Kirov, Kirov Oblast